Katharsis - Czesław Niemen's concept album released in 1976. It is about dead ends and traps on the road of expanding human civilization and space exploration. This album was recorded by Czesław Niemen alone, without help from other musicians.

The track "Epitafium (Pamięci Piotra)" is dedicated to drummer Piotr Dziemski, who helped to record Niemen's previous album "Aerolit" and who had died in 1975.

Track listing 
 "Odkrycie nowej galaktyki" - 2:20
 "Mleczna Droga" - 3:15
 "Planeta Ziemia" - 6:45
 "Fatum" - 2:23
 "Pieczęć" - 2:51
 "Z listu do M." - 4:45
 "Próba ucieczki" - 2:46
 "Katharsis" - 4:45
 "Epitafium (Pamięci Piotra)" - 3:58
 "Dorożką na Księżyc" - 5:21 (2003 CD reissue bonus)

Personnel 
 Czesław Niemen - vocal, synthesizers, mellotron 400, clavinet D6, 12 string guitar, synth percussion, cymbals, tape effects, flutes
 All lyrics by Czesław Niemen.

References 

Czesław Niemen albums
1976 albums
Electronic albums by Polish artists
Concept albums